S.S.C. Napoli won its first Serie A title with recently crowned World Cup winner Diego Maradona as their most influential player. Central defender Ciro Ferrara got his breakthrough, helping out the team to win the trophy. The two new signings Andrea Carnevale and Fernando De Napoli also proved crucial in the title-winning campaign, which sparked off fanatical celebrations in Naples.

Squad

Transfers

Winter

Competitions

Serie A

League table

Position by round

Matches

Top Scorers
  Diego Maradona 10
  Andrea Carnevale 8
  Bruno Giordano 6
  Salvatore Bagni 6

Coppa Italia 

First Round - Group 5

Eightfinals

Quarterfinals

Semifinals

Final

UEFA Cup 

First Round

Statistics

Players statistics

References

Sources
  RSSSF - Italy 1986/87

S.S.C. Napoli seasons
Napoli
1987